(SII) is a Japanese company, which develops and commercializes semiconductor, micromechatronics, and precision machining technologies. It is one of business units of Seiko Group Corporation (f/k/a Seiko Holdings).

Headquartered in the Makuhari business district, Mihama-ku, Chiba City, Chiba Prefecture, Japan, the company manufactures and sells electronic components (crystal oscillators, micromechatronics devices, piezo inkjet printheads, microbatteries, supercapacitors), precision parts, analysis and measurement instruments, machine tools, factory automation systems, printers, etc.

The company changed its name to Seiko Instruments & Electronics Ltd. in 1983 and to the current name in 1997.

On January 26, 2009, Seiko Instruments and Seiko Holdings announced that the two companies will be merged on October 1, 2009 through a share swap. Seiko Instruments became a wholly owned subsidiary of Seiko Holdings on the date that had been announced before.

Seiko had delegated a large portion of the manufacturing in its watch business to SII. Watches manufactured by SII were sold through the Seiko Watch Corporation, a subsidiary of Seiko Holdings Corporation. On April 1, 2020, the company transferred its watch business including its watch manufacturing subsidiaries Morioka Seiko Instruments, Ninohe Tokei Kogyo, Seiko Instruments Singapore, etc. to Seiko Watch.

External links 
 Seiko Instruments Inc.

Watch brands
Electronics companies of Japan
Companies based in Chiba Prefecture
Seiko
Watch movement manufacturers